The Pakistan lobby in the United States refers to the professional lobbyists paid directly by the government of Pakistan to lobby the public and government of the United States on behalf of Pakistani interests and/or on behalf of Pakistani American rights and interests.

Background

Stephen Payne is believed to be the preeminent paid lobbyist for the government of Pakistan in the U.S.  According to former Pakistani President Pervez Musharraf, Payne played a pivotal role in U.S.-Pakistan relations, serving as Pakistan's lobbyist through a group called Team Eagle (also known as Team Barakat). Payne worked as a lobbyist for Pakistan to deliver a multibillion-dollar U.S. aid package and to remove U.S. economic and military sanctions against Pakistan that had been in place for several years. He also helped Pakistan secure Major non-NATO ally status, which Pakistan received in 2004 as well as helping to secure F-16s, C-130s and military helicopters for Pakistan.

Pakistan has paid lobbyists to obtain “Reconstruction Opportunity Zones,” industrial development zones with the privilege of exporting goods manufactured in Pakistan duty-free to the United States and to maintain high levels of U.S. foreign aid.

Pakistan has sought to furthen its foreign policy interests in the United States through lobbying. In one particular incident in March 1997, the member of the House of Representatives from Indiana Dan Burton was accused of demanding a $5,000 contribution from a Pakistani lobbyist. The lobbyist said that when he was unable to raise the funds, Burton complained to the Pakistani ambassador and threatened to make sure "none of his friends or colleagues" would meet with the lobbyist or his associates.

The lobbying firm Janus-Merritt Strategies led by Iranian-American lawyer David Safavian was also registered by the Pakistani government for lobbying. Safavian was subsequently convicted of a Federal felony in the Jack Abramoff Indian lobbying scandal and served a one-year sentence in Federal prison. 
 
In 2011, the FBI arrested Syed Ghulam Nabi Fai, a U.S. citizen of Kashmiri origin, on charges of secretly lobbying for the Government of Pakistan seeking to influence decisions made in the US regarding the Kashmir conflict, and receiving illegal funding totaling over $4,000,000 from the Inter Services Intelligence agency of the Pakistani Military. Fai's passport has been surrendered to the Court and he is currently under house arrest, with strict security conditions including electronic monitoring via an ankle bracelet.  Media reports have revealed that Fai has reportedly confessed, under interrogation, to the charges.  He faces a sentence of up to 5 years for this Federal felony.

See also

 Baloch Council of North America
 Pakistan–United States relations

References

Pakistani-American organizations
Pakistan–United States relations
Lobbying in the United States